Alexander Kowalski (born 1978 in Greifswald) is a German techno music artist.

Career
Kowalski moved to Berlin in the early 1990s, and became exposed to techno music there. Early influences on his work were Joey Beltram and Synewave, though he was limited to using cheap instruments to emulate them. He performed his first live gig at the Tresor Club in Berlin, and soon thereafter got in contact with Pacou and Sender Berlin, eventually releasing his first track on Proton Records in 1999. That same year, Kowalski and collaborator Stassy from Sender Berlin debuted as the techno team Double.

Kowalski released his debut record Echoes in 2001, on the Kanzleramt label. He quickly produced a follow-up, Progress (early 2002).

A year and a half after his second album, he released Response, including the single "Belo Horizonte". He was nominated twice for the German dance award in 2003. After a break of three years, he switched record labels from Kanzleramt to Different.

Discography
 Can't Hold Me Back (Album Mix) Alexander Kowalski & Funk D'Void
 Changes (Original Mix) Alexander Kowalski
 Delicious (Original Mix) Alexander Kowalski
 House of Hell (Original Mix) Alexander Kowalski
 My Truth (Original Mix) Alexander Kowalski
 She's Worth It (Album Mix) Alexander Kowalski
 So Pure (Original Mix) Alexander Kowalski
 Start Chasing me (Original Mix) Alexander Kowalski
 The Path To Zero (Original Mix) Alexander Kowalski
 What U Gonna Do (Original Mix) Alexander Kowalski
 Your Affection (Original Mix) Alexander Kowalski

Aliases: DisX3, D Func, Double X (with Torsten Litschko).

Singles (Solo)
1999 Auto Cycles EP (as DisX3)
2000 Functones (as D Func)
2000 Dark Soul
2000 Live
2001 Echoes / Phasis
2001 Progress
2001 Art of Function (as DisX3)
2002 Waves Vol. 1 (as DisX3)
2002 All I Got To Know
2002 Hot Spot/Delicious
2003 Waves Vol. 2 (as DisX3)
2003 Belo Horizonte
2004 Lock Me Up
2004 You Think You Know

Albums (Solo)
1999 Brothers in Mind (as DisX3)
1999 Sequenzed Function (as DisX3)
1999 Untitled (as DisX3)
2001 Chaos Space Marines (as DisX3) (with Bandulu)
2001 Echoes
2002 Progress
2003 Response
2006 Changes
2018 Cycles

Co-Production
Double X (with Torsten Litschko)
1999 Strain One's Ears (album)
1999 unGleich 1
2000 UnGleich in Exile (album)
2003 Charis
2004 A:LIVE (album)
2004 Flashbacks

References

External links
Alexander Kowalski's Official Site
Alexander Kowalski's discography

1978 births
German trance musicians
Living people
People from Greifswald